Between Us is an album by jazz musician Steve Cole, released in 2000.  It features two number one hits in "Got it Goin' On" and "From the Start".  Cole's cover of the TLC song "Waterfalls" also received rave reviews from Billboard.  The album also peaked at number eight on Billboard's Top Contemporary Jazz Albums list.

Track listing 
 "Got It Goin' On" – 4:07
 "From the Start" – 3:45
 "Take Me Home to You" – 5:01
 "So Into You" – 4:03
 "For Your Love" – 4:25
 "Interlude" – 1:56
 "Together Again" – 4:04
 "Between Us" – 5:21
 "Waterfalls" – 4:03
 "Funky D" – 4:25

References 

2000 albums
Steve Cole albums
Warner Records albums